James Duncan (12 November 1869 – 19 October 1953) was a New Zealand rugby union footballer, coach and referee. He captained New Zealand in its first test, and coached New Zealand in its first home test.

Duncan was born in Dunedin, New Zealand. He appeared for Otago, before being selected to play for New Zealand in 1897. He captained New Zealand for the first time against Wellington in 1901. He captained New Zealand in its first Test, against Australia, in 1903. That was also his last game for New Zealand.

Duncan then moved to coaching, coaching New Zealand in its first home test, against Great Britain, in 1904. In 1905, he was selected to coach the New Zealand team to tour the Northern Hemisphere. Duncan's appointment as coach was unpopular, and most of the coaching ended up being done by team members Billy Stead and Dave Gallaher instead.

In 1908 James Duncan refereed a Test between New Zealand and the Anglo-Welsh.

Duncan is credited with naming the position "five-eight"; as there was already positions half-back and three-quarters, he came up with the name according to the fraction between them.

See also
New Zealand national rugby union team
The Original All Blacks (1905)

References

External links

1869 births
1953 deaths
New Zealand international rugby union players
New Zealand rugby union players
Rugby union players from Dunedin
Rugby union wing-forwards